The Dean of Westminster is the head of the chapter at Westminster Abbey. Due to the Abbey's status as a Royal Peculiar, the dean answers directly to the British monarch (not to the Bishop of London as ordinary, nor to the Archbishop of Canterbury as metropolitan). Initially, the office was a successor to that of Abbot of Westminster, and was for the first 10 years cathedral dean for the Diocese of Westminster. The current dean is David Hoyle.

List of deans

Notes

  Died in office

References

 
Deans
Westminster Abbey
Religion in the City of Westminster